The discography of the Japanese rock band Radwimps consists of twelve studio albums, four video albums, and 26 singles. Radwimps debuted as a musical act in 2003 through independent label Newtraxx, releasing the albums Radwimps (2003) and Radwimps 2: Hatten Tojō (2005). After being signed to major label Toshiba EMI, the band released their album Radwimps 3: Mujintō ni Motte Ikiwasureta Ichimai to increasing commercial success.

Radwimps have had several commercially successful songs, including "Futarigoto" (2006) which was certified Platinum by the RIAJ. Their singles "Order Made" (2008) and "Dada" (2011) both peaked at the top of Oricon's singles charts. Many Radwimps songs that were not released as singles were successful in the digital market, and have been certified gold.

Their 2016 single "Zenzenzense" is the most popular song by the band, having reached more than 278 million views on their YouTube channel. The song was used as one of the four theme songs to the anime film , and was one of 26 songs the band composed for the film's soundtrack. It reached number-one on the Billboard Japan Hot 100 and charted for 63 weeks. It also received a digital download song certification of Triple Platinum from the Recording Industry Association of Japan for sales of 750,000.

Studio albums

Compilation albums

Extended plays

Singles

Promotional singles

Other charted songs

Video albums

Music videos

Notes

References

Discographies of Japanese artists
Rock music group discographies